Alain Frédéric Carpentier (born 11 August 1933) is a French surgeon whom the President of the American Association for Thoracic Surgery calls the father of modern mitral valve repair. He is most well known for the development and popularization of a number of mitral valve repair techniques. In 1996, he performed the first minimally invasive mitral valve repair in the world and in 1998 he performed the first robotic mitral valve repair with the DaVinci robot prototype. He is the recipient of the 2007 Lasker Prize.

Biography
He received his MD from the University of Paris in 1966 and his PhD from the same university in 1975. A professor emeritus at Pierre and Marie Curie University, in the 1980s Carpentier published a landmark paper on mitral valve repair entitled The French Correction. A visiting professor at Mount Sinai School of Medicine in New York City, he currently heads the Department of Cardiovascular Surgery at the Hôpital Européen Georges-Pompidou in Paris. In 1986, he and Gilles Dreyfus performed the first artificial heart implant in Europe.

Carpentier is a member of the French Academy of Sciences and sits on the Board of Directors of the World Heart Foundation. The recipient of numerous awards, including the 1996 Prix mondial Cino Del Duca, in 2005 the American Association for Thoracic Surgery (AATS) bestowed its Medallion for Scientific Achievement for only the fifth time in its history. In announcing Carpentier as the recipient, the AATS also noted that he is "one of the foremost medical philanthropists in the world, having established a premier cardiac center in Vietnam a decade ago where over 1,000 open-heart cases are now performed annually. In addition, he has founded cardiac surgery programs in 17 French-speaking countries in Africa."
In October 2001 he received an Honorary Doctor of Medicine and Surgery degree from University of Pavia.

In 2006, Carpentier received considerable media attention in the United States as the surgeon who performed an emergency mitral valve repair procedure on Charlie Rose when the PBS television interviewer fell ill while en route to Damascus to interview Syrian President Bashar al-Assad.

In 1989, Carpentier pioneered work to use the patient's own skeletal muscle (the latimissus dorsi muscle) to repair the failing myocardium, a procedure known as cardiomyoplasty, which has since advanced into the exciting realms of tissue engineering science. In 2008, Carpentier announced a fully implantable artificial heart will be ready for clinical trial by 2011, and for alternative to transplant in 2013. It was developed and will be manufactured by him, Biomedical firm Carmat, and venture capital firm Truffle. The prototype uses electronic sensors and is made from chemically treated animal tissues, called "biomaterials," or a "pseudo-skin" of biosynthetic, microporous materials, amid another US team's prototype called 2005 MagScrew Total Artificial Heart, and Japan and South Korea researchers are racing to produce similar projects. The first clinical trial are under process since 2013.

From 2009 to 2012, Carpentier was vice-president and then president of the French Academy of Sciences.

Publications
Alain Carpentier, David Adams and Farzan Filsoufi (2010). Carpentier's reconstructive valve surgery.  Missouri: Saunders Elsevier. 368 pp. . Illustrated by Alain Carpentier and Marcia Williams.

]

Honors
Honorary degree, University of Pavia, 2001

Notes

References

  

1933 births
Living people
French surgeons
20th-century French philanthropists
Academic staff of the University of Paris
Members of the French Academy of Sciences
Commandeurs of the Légion d'honneur
Commanders of the National Order of the Cedar
Recipients of the Lasker-DeBakey Clinical Medical Research Award
21st-century French philanthropists